Emani is a Persian surname of Indian origin. It is the alternate spelling of the word Iman which denotes faith or certitude to the unseen. Emani may also be a given name. Notable people with the name include:

Given name 
 Emani Biswas, Indian politician in the 2010s and 2020s
 Emani Johnson (1998–2021), American R&B singer known professionally as Emani22
 Emani Moss, child murdered in Georgia, United States in 2013
 Emani Sambayya (1905–1972), Indian Anglican priest, theologian and president of Senate of Serampore College
 Emani Sankara Sastry (1922–1987), Indian veena player

Surname 
 Vijaya Lakshmi Emani (1957–2009), Indian-American women's rights activist

Surnames of Indian origin
Persian-language surnames